Baroness Francesca von Thyssen-Bornemisza (born 7 June 1958), formerly Francesca von Habsburg-Lothringen, is an art collector.  By birth, she is a member of the House of Thyssen-Bornemisza. She is also the former wife of Karl von Habsburg, current head of the House of Habsburg-Lorraine.

Early life
Thyssen-Bornemisza was born Francesca Anna Dolores Freiin von Thyssen-Bornemisza de Kászon et Impérfalva in Lausanne, the daughter of Baron Hans Heinrich von Thyssen-Bornemisza and his third wife, fashion model Fiona Frances Elaine Campbell-Walter, descendant of the Campbell baronets. She was educated at Le Rosey in Switzerland and at the age of eighteen attended Saint Martin's School of Art in London, but left after two years.

Career
After leaving Saint Martin's School of Art, she worked as an actress, singer and model. Her partying lifestyle in London in the 1980s earned her reputation as an It girl. 

For the ten years after she left Saint Martin's, she lived in England, New York and Los Angeles before moving to Lugano to become curator for her father's art collection. During the 1991–1995 Croatian War of Independence she visited the country to help protect Croatia's heritage and artworks and to help restore churches and paintings damaged during the fighting.

Thyssen-Bornemisza also appeared as Queen Marie-Henriette in the production Kronprinz Rudolf (2006), directed by Robert Dornhelm.

TBA21
Thyssen-Bornemisza regularly participates in biennales by commissioning new works of contemporary art through a foundation called Thyssen-Bornemisza Art Contemporary (TBA21) which she founded in 2002 in Vienna. She has built up her own art collection with around 700 works of contemporary video and digital art, by artists such as John Akomfrah, Kutluğ Ataman, Candice Breitz, Olafur Eliasson, Simon Starling and Ai Weiwei.

In 2002, Thyssen-Bornemisza rented a four-storey palace in Vienna’s UNESCO-protected first district, set up home there and opened TBA21's first exhibition space in the same building. From 2012 until 2017, TBA21 had an exhibition space in Vienna's second district, within the Augarten park. It exhibited works from the collection in thematic exhibitions twice a year. The Foundation also organises exhibitions of its collection worldwide. In 2018, works from the collection went on show at the National Gallery Prague. 

Between 2008 and 2012, Thyssen-Bornemisza regularly criticised her stepmother, Carmen Cervera, for the latter's management of the Thyssen-Bornemisza Museum in Madrid, including on the 2012 sale of John Constable's painting, The Lock. In 2018, the museum unveiled a multichannel video installation by the British artist John Akomfrah that was co-commissioned by TBA21. By 2019, TBA21 signed a four-year agreement with the Museo Nacional Thyssen-Bornemisza to present a series of contemporary art exhibitions from the TBA21 collection, along with contemporary commissions. 

In 2021, TBA21 and the Regional Government of Andalusia announced a three-year-long partnership on showing parts of the TBA21 collection at the Centro de Creación Contemporánea de Andalucía (C3A) in Córdoba.

TBA21 Academy
Established in Vienna in 2011, the TBA21 Academy is an offshoot of TBA21 that focuses on ecological and social issues. In 2017, it relocated to London.

Personal life
Francesca married the heir to the Habsburg dynasty, Karl von Habsburg, son of Otto von Habsburg, in Mariazell on 31 January 1993. They have three children.
Eleonore von Habsburg (born 28 February 1994 in Salzburg). Married civilly to Jérôme d'Ambrosio on 20 July 2020. 
Ferdinand Zvonimir von Habsburg (born 21 June 1997 in Salzburg).
Gloria (born 15 October 1999 in Salzburg), whose godparents are Gloria, Princess of Thurn and Taxis, and Hereditary Prince Heinrich of Sayn-Wittgenstein-Sayn.

Francesca and Karl separated in 2003, but did not divorce until 2017. Considering this separation, Karl's sister, Archduchess Gabriella, has assumed, since their mother Regina's death in 2010, the rank of Grand Mistress of the Order of the Starry Cross that Francesca would otherwise normally have assumed as the wife of the heir. As the wife of the head of the House of Hapsburg Francesca and her children are often accorded the unofficial honorifics of Imperial and Royal Archdukes (or duchesses) of Austria. However these titles have no legal recognition as Austria is a republic and all former royal and noble titles were abolished in 1918.
She owns a residence in Port Antonio, Jamaica, where she is a keen supporter of the reggae music industry. The couple divorced in 2017.

Honours

Dynastic Orders
  Dame of the Order of the Starry Cross (House of Habsburg)

Austrian Order
  Commander of the Decoration of Honour for Services to the Republic of Austria, Gold

See also
Thyssen
Thyssen family

References

External links
 
 We Are Not a Muse

1958 births
Austrian people of American descent
Francesca
Princesses by marriage
Austrian art collectors
Austrian Roman Catholics
Francesca
Living people
Francesca
Alumni of Saint Martin's School of Art
Alumni of Institut Le Rosey